RusVelo Women's Team, a part of the Russian Global Cycling Project (which included Team Katusha and Itera–Katusha), was a Russian road & track cycling team.
RusVelo included both men's and women's rosters.

Team history

2014

Riders out
On November 5 Elena Kuchinskaya left the team to join Servetto Footon as did Tatiana Antoshina on November 8. On December 6, Aizhan Zhaparova left the team to join Astana–Acca Due O.

Major wins

2012
Overall Albstadt, Hanka Kupfernagel
Stage 3 Tour of Adygeya, Irina Molicheva
Prologue Thüringen-Rundfahrt der Frauen, Hanka Kupfernagel
GP Oberbaselbiet, Hanka Kupfernagel
Lorsch Cyclo-cross, Hanka Kupfernagel
Frankfurt Cyclo-cross, Hanka Kupfernagel
2013
Stage 1 Tour of Adygeya, Alexandra Burchenkova
Stage 1 Tour de Bretagne, Oxana Kozonchuk
Stage 1 Tour Féminin en Limousin, Oxana Kozonchuk
Stadl Paura Cyclo-cross, Hanka Kupfernagel
Lorsch Cyclo-cross, Hanka Kupfernagel
2014
 Overall Vuelta Femenina a Costa Rica, Olga Zabelinskaya
Team classification
Stage 2, Olga Zabelinskaya
Grand Prix GSB, Olga Zabelinskaya
Prologue Vuelta a El Salvador, Olga Zabelinskaya
Stage 5 Vuelta a El Salvador, Inga Čilvinaitė
EKZ CrossTour – Baden, Eva Lechner
EKZ CrossTour – Dielsdorf, Eva Lechner

National and continental champions
2012
 Russia National Time Trial Championships, Olga Zabelinskaya
 European U23 Track Championships (Team Pursuit), Lydia Malakhova
 European U23 Track Championships (Team Pursuit), Elena Lichmanova
2013
 European U23 Track Championship, Maria Mishina
 Russia National Track Championship (Team Pursuit), Maria Mishina
2014
 Russia National Time Trial Championships, Tatiana Antoshina
 Russia National Road Race Championships, Tatiana Antoshina

See also
RusVelo men's team: RusVelo

References

UCI Women's Teams
Defunct cycling teams based in Russia
Cycling teams established in 2012
Cycling teams disestablished in 2014
2012 establishments in Russia
2014 disestablishments in Russia